Donald Volney Rattan (September 12, 1924March 8, 2017) was a United States Army Major General.

Early life and education
Rattan was born at Fort Benning, Georgia on 12 September 1924 to William Volney Rattan, an Infantry officer, and Rose Harriett Ross.

Career
Rattan attended the United States Military Academy graduating in the class of 1945.

In May 1960 then Lieutenant Colonel Rattan wrote "Antiguerrilla Operations: A Case Study from History" a study of U.S. Cavalry General George Crook's Indian War campaigns of the 1870s which was published in the United States Army Combined Arms Center journal Military Review.

In August 1964, LCol Rattan was serving with the US Consulate in Bukavu in eastern Congo where he advised Government forces in the defense of the city during the Simba rebellion and in the rescue of western hostages in Operation Dragon Rouge.

Vietnam War
Col. Rattan served as commander of the 1st Brigade, 1st Cavalry Division from April 1967 to March 1968. In November 1967 the 1st Brigade was placed under the operational control of the 4th Infantry Division and saw combat at the Battle of Dak To. In late January 1968, following the transfer of the entire 1st Cavalry Division north to I Corps he led the brigade in the successful defense of Quảng Trị City during the Tet Offensive.

Post Vietnam
MGen Rattan commanded the 8th Infantry Division from August 1970 until May 1972.

Later life
Rattan died on 8 March 2017 in San Antonio, Texas and was buried at Fort Sam Houston National Cemetery.

References

External sources

1924 births
2017 deaths
United States Army generals
United States Military Academy alumni
United States Army personnel of the Vietnam War